The canton of Mamers is an administrative division of the Sarthe department, northwestern France. Its borders were modified at the French canton reorganisation which came into effect in March 2015. Its seat is in Mamers.

It consists of the following communes:
 
Aillières-Beauvoir
Arçonnay
Les Aulneaux
Avesnes-en-Saosnois
Blèves
Champfleur
Chenay
Commerveil
Congé-sur-Orne
Contilly
Courgains
Dangeul
Louvigny
Louzes
Lucé-sous-Ballon
Mamers
Marollette
Marolles-les-Braults
Les Mées
Meurcé
Mézières-sur-Ponthouin
Moncé-en-Saosnois
Monhoudou
Nauvay
Neufchâtel-en-Saosnois
Nouans
Panon
Peray
Pizieux
René
Saint-Aignan
Saint-Calez-en-Saosnois
Saint-Cosme-en-Vairais
Saint-Longis
Saint Paterne - Le Chevain
Saint-Pierre-des-Ormes
Saint-Rémy-des-Monts
Saint-Rémy-du-Val
Saint-Vincent-des-Prés
Saosnes
Thoigné
Vezot
Villaines-la-Carelle
Villeneuve-en-Perseigne

References

Cantons of Sarthe